Prudhoe Bay  is a census-designated place (CDP) located in North Slope Borough in the U.S. state of Alaska. As of the 2010 census, the population of the CDP was 2,174 people, up from just five residents in the 2000 census; however, at any given time, several thousand transient workers support the Prudhoe Bay oil field. The airport, lodging and general store are located in Deadhorse, and the rigs and processing facilities are located on scattered gravel pads laid atop the tundra. It is only during winter that the surface is hard enough to support heavy equipment, and new construction happens at that time.

Prudhoe Bay is the unofficial northern terminus of the Pan-American Highway. As the bay itself is still 10 miles further north through a security checkpoint, open water is not visible from the highway. A few tourists, arriving by bus after a two-day ride up the Dalton Highway from Fairbanks, come to see the tundra, the Arctic Ocean and the midnight sun, staying in lodgings assembled from modular buildings. Tours must be arranged in advance to see the Arctic Ocean and the bay itself.

Prudhoe Bay was named in 1826 by British explorer Sir John Franklin after his classmate Captain Algernon Percy, Baron Prudhoe. Franklin traveled westerly along the coast from the mouth of the Mackenzie River in Canada almost to Point Barrow.

Geography

The total area is 25.40% water.

Climate
Prudhoe Bay, along with similar communities on the North Slope of Alaska, features a tundra climate (Köppen ET). Winters are long and frigid, and because the area is above the Arctic Circle, the sun does not rise during several weeks of each winter.

Demographics

Prudhoe Bay first appeared on the 1970 U.S. Census as an unincorporated village. It was made a census-designated place (CDP) in 1980.

As of the 2010 United States Census, there were 2,174 people living in the CDP. The racial makeup of the CDP was 83.0% White, 1.9% Black, 7.5% Native American, 1.5% Asian, 0.1% Pacific Islander, 0.3% from some other race and 1.6% from two or more races. 4.0% were Hispanic or Latino of any race.

Prudhoe Bay oil field

Prudhoe Bay is adjacent to the largest oil field in the United States.

Health care
Prudhoe Bay is classified as an isolated town/sub-regional center. It is found in EMS Region 6A in the North Slope Region. Emergency services have limited highway, coastal and airport access. Emergency service is provided by a paid emergency medical services unit and Fairweather Deadhorse Medical Clinic. Auxiliary health care is provided by oil company medical staff and the Greater Prudhoe Bay Fire Dept. Individuals requiring hospital care are usually transported to the nearest hospital/medical center, Sammuel Simmonds Memorial Hospital, in Utqiaġvik. Because no roads connect Prudhoe Bay to Utqiaġvik, patients are transported by helicopter or air ambulance (a flight of approximately 45 minutes).

See also

2006 Alaskan oil spill
Alaska Pipeline
Ice Road Truckers

References

External links

 Prudhoe Bay information website

Census-designated places in Alaska
Census-designated places in North Slope Borough, Alaska
Populated coastal places in Alaska on the Arctic Ocean
Populated places of the Arctic United States
Prud